Aiome (Ayom) is a Ramu language of Papua New Guinea.

References

External links 
OLAC resources in and about the Aiome language

Middle Ramu languages
Languages of Madang Province